Kristian Ek (born 18 June 1989 in Sundsvall) is a Swedish football player currently playing for GIF Sundsvall. In March 2009 he was loaned out to Östersunds FK, who play in the Division 1 Norra, but after only a handful of games he was recalled to GIF Sundsvall. He's a defender. He is playing for the soccer team of the Stockholm School of Economics at the moment and led the team to the victory at the Euroesade 2013 in Barcelona.

References

External links
 GIF Sundsvall profile 
  (archive)
 

1989 births
Living people
Swedish footballers
GIF Sundsvall players
Östersunds FK players
Stockholm School of Economics alumni
People from Sundsvall
Association football defenders
Sportspeople from Västernorrland County